Mario Briceño Iragorry (Trujillo, 15 September 1897 – Caracas, 16 June 1958), was a Venezuelan intellectual and cultural analyst. He was also a notable writer, politician, journalist, lawyer, historian, diplomatic and teacher. He won the National Prize for Literature in 1948. The Mario Briceño Iragorry Municipality in Aragua is named for him.

Bibliography
 Horas Hours (1921)
 Motivos Motives (1922)
 Ventanas en la noche Windows in the Night (1925)
 Lecturas Venezolanas Venezuelan Lectures (1926)
 Tapices de Historia Patria History Homeland Tapestries (1933)
 Temas Inconclusos Unfinished topics (1942)
 Sentido y Ámbito del Congreso de Angostura Meaning and Scope of the Congress of Angostura (1943)
 Relación geográfica de la Provincia de Cuyas Geographical relation to the Cuyas Province(1947)
 El Caballo de Ledesma The Horse from Ledesma (1951)
 Trujillo
 Sentido y presencia de Miranda Sense and Presence of Miranda (1950)
 La Tragedia de Peñalver The Tragedy of Peñalver (1951)
 Mensaje sin Destino Message without Destination (1951)
 Por la ciudad hacia el mundo For the city to the World (1957)
 Ideario Político Political Ideology (1958)

Venezuelan male writers
Male novelists
1897 births
1958 deaths
Academic staff of the Central University of Venezuela
20th-century Venezuelan novelists
Burials at the National Pantheon of Venezuela
20th-century male writers